is a former Japanese football player.

Playing career
Koike was born in Shizuoka Prefecture on August 24, 1980. After graduating from Shizuoka Gakuen High School, he joined the newly promoted J2 League club, Oita Trinita in 1999. On May 22, he debuted as a substitute midfielder in the 82nd minute against Sagan Tosu. However he only played in that match and retired at the end of the 2000 season.

Club statistics

References

External links

1980 births
Living people
Association football people from Shizuoka Prefecture
Japanese footballers
J2 League players
Oita Trinita players
Association football midfielders